Priyam Garg (born 30 November 2000) is an Indian cricketer. He made his List A debut for Uttar Pradesh in the 2018–19 Vijay Hazare Trophy on 19 September 2018. He made his first-class debut for Uttar Pradesh in the 2018–19 Ranji Trophy on 1 November 2018. In December 2018, during the match against Tripura, he scored his maiden double century in first-class cricket. He made his Twenty20 debut for Uttar Pradesh in the 2018–19 Syed Mushtaq Ali Trophy on 21 February 2019.

In August 2019, he was named in the India Green's squad for the 2019–20 Duleep Trophy. In October 2019, he was named in India C's squad for the 2019–20 Deodhar Trophy. In the 2019–20 Vijay Hazare Trophy, he scored 287 runs in six matches. In December 2019, he was named as the captain of India's squad for the 2020 Under-19 Cricket World Cup. He led India to the finals where they lost to Bangladesh.

In February 2022, he was bought by the Sunrisers Hyderabad in the auction for the 2022 Indian Premier League tournament.

References

External links
 

2000 births
Living people
Indian cricketers
Sunrisers Hyderabad cricketers
Uttar Pradesh cricketers
Cricketers from Lucknow